Vlachata (Greek: Βλαχάτα, also Βλαχάτα Εικοσιμίας) is a village and a community in the eastern part of the municipal unit of Leivatho near the south coast of the island of Kefalonia, Greece.  To avoid confusion with another Vlachata near Sami, it is also known as Vlachata Eikosimias. The community consists of the villages Vlachata and Simotata, which is 2 km east of Vlachata. Vlachata is situated on a mountain slope above the Ionian Sea coast, at about 200 m elevation. Mount Ainos, the highest point of Cephalonia, is 4 km to the northeast. Vlachata is 1 km northwest of Lourdata, 2 km southeast of Mousata, 13 km southwest of Poros and 13 km southeast of Argostoli. The road from Argostoli to Poros runs through Vlachata. Vlachata suffered great damage from the 1953 Ionian earthquake.

Historical population

See also
List of settlements in Cephalonia

References

Populated places in Cephalonia